Bernard Shaw (born 15 June 1956) is a Canadian-English singer, and since 1986, the lead vocalist of British rock band Uriah Heep.

Career 

At the beginning of 1970 Shaw dreamed of becoming a rock guitarist. He bought himself a Gibson SG Special and started practicing. When the local band Cold Sweat was looking for a second guitarist in 1974, Shaw auditioned, but bass player Bill Kempster advised him to put down the guitar and to buy a mic from their old singer and come back the next week. Shaw followed up this advice, and when he auditioned as a singer the band hired him as their new vocalist. Cold Sweat toured extensively over the next three years, playing across British Columbia, Alberta, Saskatchewan, and into Manitoba. Their live set of a mixture of classic melodic rock soon became their calling card on the hotel, and live club scene. The changing music scene and popularity of discos caused the Victoria band to break up in 1977. In that same year, he was called to join Saskatoon based band Legend, who had lost their lead singer Danny Jeans. They had heard Shaw singing with Cold Sweat on many occasions and knew he would fit their needs. Shaw relocated to Stoon and stayed for nine months before Legend also resolved due to lack of live work. Shaw returned to Victoria to consider his next move. After weeks of contemplation, he decided to move to England and try his luck in London. 
 
In December 1978, Shaw boarded a plane and left Canada chasing a dream. On arriving in London he auditioned and got the job of lead singer with London-based band Paris founded by keyboard player and songwriter Phil Lanzon. A partnership that would last for years to come. Paris signed a record deal with RCA and changed their name to Grand Prix.  Shaw sang on their first album Grand Prix which was released in 1980. When Shaw returned from his sister's wedding in Canada in October 1981 he learned he had been replaced by Robin McAuley. Talk started of a 30-something-year reunion for Grand Prix following Uriah Heep's acclaimed performance at Childline Rocks (1 June 2009); several ex-members spoke for the first time since the unscheduled departure of Shaw, but they decided it was the right move to enlist McAuley as vocalist due to his different vocal style.

In December 1981, Shaw joined Praying Mantis, a band formed in 1978. Other band members were Tino Troy (guitar), Chris Troy (bass), Dave Potts (drums) and John Bavin (keyboards). The band was managed by Deep Purple manager John Coletta but they still had problems getting a record deal. Shaw did not record an album with Praying Mantis but did appear on the EP Turn The Tables, recorded in 1982. Praying Mantis primarily played live in various venues, including the Reading Festival. In 1993, a bootleg was going around called "live + singles" which contained six songs performed at the Reading Festival and other fragments and singles.

From December 1983 to the middle of 1984, Shaw played in Clive Burr's Escape, a band started by ex-Iron Maiden drummer Clive Burr. Praying Mantis members Chris and Tino Troy were also in the group. Shortly after Shaw joined, the band went on as Escape.

In July 1984, the band again chose a new name, Stratus. Like Praying Mantis, Stratus played melodic hard rock. The album Throwing Shapes was recorded at the Frankfurter Dreamboat studio with Tino Troy on guitar, Alan Nelson on keyboards, Chris Troy on bass, and Clive Burr on drums. It was released in the fall of 1984. In 1993, the CD version Reborn Classics was released. As a bonus track on this bootleg the Soundhouse Tapes are added. Stratus also had one song as a movie soundtrack. The song "Run For Your Life" is used in Class of Nuke 'Em High (1986, USA).

When Stratus finally played their last gig at the London Marquee Club in the audience that night was Uriah Heep guitarist Mick Box. Uriah Heep's singer, Steff Fontaine, had just been fired, and Box was looking for a singer whose voice could handle the range of Heep’s songs and also the rigorous touring schedule. Box asked Shaw to audition for Uriah Heep and then hired him as the band's new front man.

Shaw's first album with Heep was ''Live in Moscow'’ in Dec.1987 recorded at the now legendary first ever tour of a western rock band in Russia. The 10 concerts at the Olympiski Stadium brought in excess of 185,000 Russian fans to see their favourite band. Heep have now visited Russia more than 19 times and have played from West coast to East coast of the country. 

In 1995, Shaw had serious throat problems and it looked for a while as if he would have to quit his singing career. For concerts in Austria and South Africa former Heep vocalist John Lawton was deputized. Shaw recovered after minor surgery. He is now the band's longest-serving vocalist.

In December 1995, Shaw started a hobby band in Victoria, British Columbia, Canada, called ‘In Transit’. Teaming up with former band mates Don Restall, Kevin Williams, Steve Moyer, and guitarist Dale Collins, the band did cover versions of Van Halen, 38 Special, Dan Reed Network, Stage Dolls, Foreigner, Ritchie Sambora, and a few Uriah Heep songs. Due to his busy schedule, Bernie and in Transit played a limited number of shows in 1995 and early 1996. This led to the forming of the Collins~Shaw Project, with Bernie Shaw, Dale Collins, and Don Restall. During Bernies' next visit to Canada in 1997, the Collins~Shaw Project recorded and EP called Picking Locks, which was released the following year. The project also released a single called Sad Song.

In August and September 1997, Shaw was in the Canadian ‘Rock Ridge Studios’ to sing on the album of his friend Kevin Williams, whom he knew from In Transit. It was a tribute album to Williams' wife who died of cancer around Christmas 1996. The CD was released in private by Kevin Williams for the Canadian market only. Bernie Shaw, as, in fact, all the current Uriah Heep's members, collaborated in 2001 with Romanian heavy-metal legends Iris, on a track called "Lady in Black" which had great success in Romania during that year.

References

External links

1956 births
Canadian rock singers
Canadian male singers
Canadian heavy metal singers
Canadian people of Scottish descent
Living people
Musicians from Victoria, British Columbia
Uriah Heep (band) members